Ursula Schulz-Dornburg (born 1938) is a German photographer and artist known for the conceptual series (mostly black and white) photographs. She lives and works in Düsseldorf.

Schulz-Dornburg received the 2016 AIMIA AGO Photography Prize from the Art Gallery of Ontario and in 2018 won the Catalogue of the Year award at the Paris Photo–Aperture Foundation PhotoBook Awards for The Land In Between. Old Masters like Jan van Eyck, Albrecht Dürer, Rembrandt van Rijn, and Jean-Auguste-Dominique Ingres coexist with works by some of today's most fascinating modern artists including Gerhard Richter, Chuck Close, and Bridget Riley.

Life and work

Schulz-Dornburg was born in Berlin in 1938. Between 1959 and 1960 she studied at the Institut für Bildjournalismus in Munich. From 1980 onward, she traveled within Europe, Asia and the Near East.

Publications
Architectures of Waiting. Bonn: Goethe-Institut, 2006. With a text by J.Thorn-Prikker. 
Reprinted edition. Walther Koenig, 2014. . English and German language text. Published on the occasion of the exhibition Conflict, Time, Photography at Tate Modern, London.
Some Works. Edited and with text by Wolfgang Scheppe. . English and German language text. Box containing objects and materials. Edition of 1500 copies.
The Land in Between. London: Mack, 2018. English edition. . German edition, .
Yerevan 1996/1997. London: Mack, 2019. English edition. .
Zone Grise. London: Mack, 2019. French language edition and addition to The Land in Between. .
Bugis Houses, Celebes. London: Mack, 2021. . With an essay by Sirtjo Koolhof.

Awards
2018: Catalogue of the Year award, Paris Photo–Aperture Foundation PhotoBook Awards, Paris for The Land In Between.
2016: AIMIA AGO Photography Prize from the Art Gallery of Ontario

Exhibitions 

1975 Vorhänge am Markusplatz in Venedig mit Katharina Sattler, Gallery Heiner Friedrich, Munich; Gallery Wittrock, Düsseldorf, Germany
1976 Palace Pier, Brighton with Katharina Sattler, Kaiser-Wilhelm-Museum, Krefeld, Germany
1979 Ansichten von Pagan with F. Rudolf Knubel; German Commission for UNESCO, Bonn; Stadtmuseum Düsseldorf, Germany
1984-1981	Der Tigris des alten Mesopotamien mit F. Rudolf Knubel, Museum Quadrat Bottrop, Bottrop; Museum des 20. Jahrhunderts, Wien, Austria; Kestnergesellschaft, Hannover, Germany
1999-1992	Weizen, in: Gen-Welten, Kunst- und Ausstellungshalle der Bundesrepublik Deutschland, Bonn; in: Naturale Reality, Ludwigforum, Aachen; Museum der Brotkultur, Ulm, Germany
1997-1992	Sonnenstand, Art Institute of Chicago; Corcoran Gallery of Art, Washington DC; Gallery Wittrock, Düsseldorf, Germany
2000 Borderscapes, Gallery Wittrock, Düsseldorf, Germany
2001 Transitsites, Neuhoff Gallery, New York, Gallery Wittrock, Düsseldorf, Germany
2002 Transit Orte, Gallery Werner Klein, Cologne, Germany
2002 Der 45. Längengrad, Gallery Sabine Knust, Munich, Germany
2004-2002	Across the territories, Galeria Casa Vallarta, Guadalajara, Mexiko; Centro Fotogràfico Alvares Bravo, Oaxaca, Mexiko; IVAM, Institut Valencià d'Art Modern, Valencia, Spain
2004 Memoryscapes, Gallery Werner Klein, Cologne
2006 Wüste am 45. Längengrad, Kunst-Station St. Peter (Cologne), Germany
2006-2004	Architekturen des Wartens, Museum Ludwig, Cologne; Gallery Elke Dröscher, Hamburg; Gallery AEDES West, Berlin
2006 PAGAN Zeit aus Stein, Gallery Sabine Knust, Munich, Germany
2006 Irak. Vanished landscapes, Gallery Heike Curtze, Berlin
2007 Photographs, Krefelder Kunstverein, Krefeld, Germany
2008 presencia y ausencia, Fundación BBK, Bilbao
2008 Objectivités - La photographie à Düsseldorf (Gruppenausstellung), Musée d´Art Moderne de la Ville de Paris - MAM/ARC
2008 Photographie, Beck & Eggeling new quarters, Düsseldorf
2008 Luz de la Fotografía. Silencio de la Arquitectura, Auditorio de San Francisco, Ávila
2008 Tongkonan, Alang and the House without smoke, Aedes am Pfefferberg, Berlin
2009 Sonnestand, Tristan Hoare/Wilmotte, London
2018 The Land In-between: Photographs from 1980 to 2012, Städel Museum, Frankfurt, Germany, April–September 2018
Zone Grise/The Land in Between, Maison Européenne de la Photographie, Paris, France, December 2019 - February 2020

Collections
Schulz-Dornburg's work is held in the following public collections:
 the J. Paul Getty Museum,
 the Tate, and
 the National Gallery of Canada.

References

External links 

1938 births
Living people
German women photographers
21st-century German photographers
20th-century German photographers
German conceptual artists
20th-century German women artists
21st-century German women artists
Artists from Düsseldorf
Women conceptual artists
Photographers from Berlin